George V. Chilingarian (he uses both Chilingar and Chilingarian as his last name) is an American-Armenian Professor of Civil and Petroleum Engineering at the University of Southern California (USC). He is one of the best-known petroleum geologists in the world and the founder of several prestigious journals in the oil and gas industry.

Chilingar has published 72 books and over 500 of articles on geology, petroleum engineering and environmental engineering. He serves as president of the U.S. branch of the Russian Academy of Natural Sciences and 17 of his books have been translated into Russian. In recognition of these contributions, the Russian Academy of Natural Sciences has honored him as a Knight of Arts and Sciences.

He received his bachelor's and master's degrees in petroleum engineering and a Ph.D. in geology (with a minor in petroleum engineering), all at USC.

His greatest contribution to the petroleum industry may be a means of identifying oil-rich rock by analyzing the ratio of calcium to magnesium in core samples. This method was used in discovering one of Iran's largest oil fields, which was then named after Chilingar.

Scientia Iranica has published a special issue in "Transactions C: Chemistry and Chemical Engineering" dedicated to the lifelong achievements of Chilingar.

He also played a key role in the development of Thailand's offshore oil reserves. Chilingar saw natural gas bubbles in the Gulf of Siam and redirected exploratory efforts, thus saving the nascent Thai oil industry.

In 2001, King Fahd of Saudi Arabia acknowledged Chilingar's significant contributions to the success of Saudi Aramco as well as the discovery and extraction of oil reserves around the world. The Saudi consul general in Los Angeles, Ambassador Mohammed A. Al-Salloum, presented the award.

He served as senior petroleum engineering adviser to the United Nations from 1967 to 1969, and then again from 1978 to 1987. He was also an energy policy adviser to California Governor Ronald Reagan in 1973.

His recent research work concentrated on:

 Environmental aspects of oil and gas production
 Petrophysical properties of rocks and drilling fluids
 Surface and subsurface operations in petroleum production
 Subsidence due to the fluid withdrawal, testing and storage of petroleum products

Selected honors and awards
 Distinguished Achievement Award for Petroleum Engineering Faculty (The Society of Petroleum Engineers) in recognition for outstanding contributions in the field of petroleum engineering education, 1984
 Society of Petroleum Engineers Distinguished Membership, 2020
 Editor of Sedimentary Geology (one of the founders)
 Special Issue of Energy Sources Journal, Vol. 21, Nov. 1-2, 1999, A Tribute to Professor  George V. Chilingarian
 Crown and Eagle Medal of Honor from the Russian Academy of Natural Sciences,  2000
 Gold Medals of Honor from Iran, Thailand, Taiwan, Honduras, El Salvador, Armenia and Russia
 Honorary Professor of Gubkin Russian State University of Oil and Gas

References

External links
 George V. Chilingar home page at USC
 L. F. Khilyuk and G. V. Chilingar, 2006, On global forces of nature driving the Earth’s climate. Are humans involved? 
 Rebuttal of “On global forces of nature driving the Earth's climate. Are humans involved?” by L. F. Khilyuk and G. V. Chilingar

American geologists
USC Viterbi School of Engineering alumni
University of Southern California faculty
Foreign Members of the Russian Academy of Sciences
Living people
Year of birth missing (living people)